is a Japanese television jidaigeki or period drama that was broadcast in 1985 to 1986. It is the 23rd in the Hissatsu series. Isuzu Yamada made her final appearance in the Hissatsu series.

Plot
Kumihimoya no Ryu is a maker of cords used to tie obi and is an ex-ninja. Hanaya no Masa runs flower shop. They join Nakamura Mondo and Oriku’s Shigotonin team replacing Hide and Yuji in the sequel to Hissatsu Shigotonin IV.

Cast
Makoto Fujita as Mondo Nakamura
Masaki Kyomoto as Kumihimoya no Ryu
Hiroaki Murakami as Hanaya no Masa
Ayukawa Izumi as Nandemoya no Kayo
Ippie Hikaru as Junnosuke Nishi
Isuzu Yamada as Oriku (episode1-11)
Kin Sugai as Sen Nakamura
Mari Shiraki as Ritsu Nakamura
Yoko Nada as Oshin
Toshio Yamauchi as Chief Constable (Hittōdōshin) Kumagorō Tanaka
Sakae Umezu as Tamasuke

References

1985 Japanese television series debuts
1980s drama television series
Jidaigeki television series